Brian John Donnelly  (5 November 1949 – 25 September 2008) was a New Zealand politician. He was a member of the New Zealand First party.

Early life and career
Donnelly was born in Auckland, New Zealand as the third of five children. His father worked as a fabric cutter and later as a real estate agent. Donnelly attended Sacred Heart College on a scholarship. He studied at Massey University and Auckland University, and received a Bachelor of Arts, a Bachelor of Education, a Master of Educational Administration, a Diploma in Teaching, and a Diploma in Second Language Teaching. He then worked in the education sector in New Zealand and the Cook Islands, which included deputy principal at Titikaveka College in Rarotonga from 1977 to 1980, and principal of Whangarei Intermediate School from 1990 to 1996 (only resigning from the latter on entering parliament).

Member of Parliament

In the 1993 election, he stood for the newly formed New Zealand First in the Whangarei electorate, but was unsuccessful. In the 1996 election, with the advent of the MMP system, Donnelly was ranked third on the New Zealand First list, and entered Parliament. He has retained his third-place position in New Zealand First's list until his retirement.

When New Zealand First formed a coalition with the National Party, Donnelly became Minister Responsible for the Education Review Office, Associate Minister of Education, and Associate Minister of Pacific Island Affairs. When the coalition disintegrated, and New Zealand First itself began to splinter, Donnelly was one of those MPs who remained loyal to the party. He was one of five New Zealand First MPs to avoid the collapse of the party's vote in the 1999 election. After the 2002 election he was appointed chair of Parliament's Education and Science Committee.

Donnelly has been regarded as a social liberal within his caucus, and voted for civil unions in New Zealand as well as Sue Bradford's member's bill to remove the provision allowing parents to use reasonable force in correcting their children. In retaliation, current New Zealand First President Dail Jones threatened demotion of the long-serving List MP, as well as fellow repeal supporter Doug Woolerton. Donnelly was widely respected by Members from other political parties.

In February 2008, Donnelly was appointed as New Zealand's High Commissioner to the Cook Islands, and Dail Jones was sworn in to replace him as a list MP on 15 February 2008. Donnelly was a speaker of Cook Islands Māori, unlike most Foreign Affairs diplomats.

In the 2008 Queen's Birthday Honours, Donnelly was appointed a Companion of the Queen's Service Order, for public services.

Personal life
Donnelly met his wife Linda through teaching and they married in 1970. They had three children, Theresa, Ioane, and Erena.

Illness and death
In August 2008, Donnelly resigned from his position due to ill health. He died on 25 September 2008.

Notes

References

External links
 Obituary—Brian Donnelly, Hansard New Zealand Parliament
 Obituary,  Northern Advocate
 Obituary, stuff.co.nz

1949 births
2008 deaths
New Zealand First MPs
People from Whangārei
People educated at Sacred Heart College, Auckland
New Zealand list MPs
High Commissioners of New Zealand to the Cook Islands
Companions of the Queen's Service Order
University of Auckland alumni
Massey University alumni
Members of the New Zealand House of Representatives
20th-century New Zealand politicians
21st-century New Zealand politicians
Unsuccessful candidates in the 1993 New Zealand general election